Charles Adkins (April 27, 1932 in Gary, Indiana – July 8, 1993) was a boxer from the United States.

Amateur career
Chuck Adkins was the Olympic Gold Medalist at the 1952 Helsinki Olympics, in the Light Welterweight (140 lb/63.5 kg) class. In the final he defeated Viktor Mednov of the Soviet Union on a 2-1 decision. The bout was notable as being the first ever boxing match between the United States and the Soviet Union.

At the time of the Olympics, Adkins, was a 20-year-old police administration student. Adkins also won the National AAU Lightweight championship in 1949.

Adkins attended San Jose State University, which had a dominant collegiate boxing program.

1952 Olympic results 
Below is the Record Of Charles Adkins, an American light welterweight boxer who competed at the 1952 Helsinki Olympics:

 Round of 32: Defeated Leif Hansen (Norway) referee stopped contest in first round
 Round of 16: Defeated Salomon Carrizales (Venezuela) by decision, 3-0
 Quarterfinal: Defeated Alexander Grant Webster (South Africa) by decision, 3-0
 Semifinal: Defeated Bruno Visintin (Italy) by decision, 3-0
 Final Defeated Viktor Mednov (Soviet Union) by decision, 2-1 (won gold medal)

Charles Adkins bout vs. Viktor Mednov was the first ever sanctioned world class boxing match between U.S. and Soviet boxers.

References 
 The Complete Book of the Olympics
  retrieved November 22, 2010

1932 births
1993 deaths
Boxers from Indiana
Boxers at the 1952 Summer Olympics
Olympic boxers of the United States
Olympic gold medalists for the United States in boxing
Sportspeople from Gary, Indiana
San Jose State Spartans boxers
American male boxers
Medalists at the 1952 Summer Olympics
Light-welterweight boxers